Roger Williams (1603–1683) was an English theologian and co-founder of Rhode Island.

Roger Williams may also refer to:

People
 Roger Williams (soldier) (1539/40–1595), Welsh soldier of fortune and military theorist
 Roger Williams (Assemblyman) (1836–?), American politician
 Roger D. Williams (1856–1925), American army officer
 Roger Williams (actor) (1898–1964), American film actor  
 Roger Q. Williams (1894–1976), American aviator
 Roger Williams (pianist) (1924–2011), American pianist
 Roger Williams (organist) (born 1943), British (Welsh) organist and musicologist
 Roger Williams (British politician) (born 1948), British politician
 Roger Williams (Texas politician) (born 1949), American politician, member of the U.S. House of Representatives from Texas
 Roger Williams (Georgia politician), member of the Georgia House of Representatives
 Roger Williams (playwright) (born 1974), Welsh playwright
 Roger Williams (born 1979), with Roger Williams and the All Mixed-Up Quartet
 Roger Williams (author), American science fiction author of The Metamorphosis of Prime Intellect
 Roger Ross Williams (born 1962), American television director, producer and writer

Scientists and engineers 
 Roger Williams (chemist) (1890–1978), American chemist at Du Pont, Perkin Medal recipient
 Roger J. Williams (1893–1988), American biochemist 
 Roger L. Williams, structural biologist
 Roger Lawrence Williams (1923–2017), American historian
 Roger Williams (professor), Welsh educationalist
 Roger Williams (hepatologist) (1931–2020), British liver specialist

Other
 Roger Williams Park, Rhode Island, United States
 Roger Williams University, Rhode Island, United States
 Roger Williams (train), an innovative DMU train introduced by the New York, New Haven and Hartford Railroad in the United States in the 1960s

See also
 William Rogers (disambiguation)